Vilisova is a rural locality (a settlement) in Cherdynsky District, Perm Krai, Russia. The population was 2 as of 2010. There is 1 street.

Geography 
Vilisova is located 122 km southwest of Cherdyn (the district's administrative centre) by road. Ust-Urolka is the nearest rural locality.

References 

Rural localities in Cherdynsky District